The Chase (lit. “No Matter What, I’ll Catch You”) is a 2017 South Korean crime thriller film about a landowner who teams up with a former detective to chase after the suspect of a 30-year-old unsolved case. 
The film was directed by Kim Hong-seon and stars Baek Yoon-sik and Sung Dong-il.

Plot

Shim Deok-su is a grumpy landlord of several working-class flats who constantly harasses his tenants for rent. A Korean War refugee from the north, he possesses a Scrooge-like reputation and is widely despised about town. At the beginning of the movie we see him begin his day by dropping in on Mr Choi, a hard-up tenant who has been suffering from ailments that prevent him from working, to demand rent just as the latter is being visited by charity workers from a local church. Unmoved by the volunteer's pleas for empathy and unperturbed by their subsequent attempts to guilt-trip him, Deok-su leaves to go about his chores. As he goes about his routine he comes across two dead bodies as they are being cleared by police, one of a local drunk and the other a pensioner living alone.

In the evening Deok-su revisits Mr Choi, who has prepared an extravagant dinner in anticipation of a former colleague's visit. The two men eat, and during the ensuing conversation, Mr Choi reveals himself to have been a former police detective and opines that the two deaths Deok-su had encountered earlier were murders committed by someone who was likely practising on the elderly prior to moving on to young women.

Mr Choi's theory is soon proven correct. That same night he is murdered by an unseen assailant who covers up his crime, arranging Mr Choi's body as a suicide. Meanwhile, another murder takes place just a few units down the corridor. Ji-Eun, a chaste young worker at a nearby textile mill who is another tenant of Deok-su's, returns to find her roommate murdered, the young woman's throat has been slit. Unbeknownst to her, the murderer has yet to leave the flat; he bashes her head and kidnaps her.

The entire neighborhood blames Deok-su for Mr Choi's death based on the earlier encounter with the church workers. The only person who doesn't believe this is Mr Choi's former partner, retired Detective Pyung-Dal, who shows up a day late. Pyung-Dal digs up proof that Mr Choi was far from suicidal and shares with Deok-su details concerning a string of similar murders of pensioners and young women that had taken place thirty years before. Realizing that Ji-Eun fits the profile of the victims Pyung-Dal had been describing, Deok-su rushes back to her apartment to check in on her.

After a run-in with a gang of youthful thugs — one of whom happens to be the lover of the murdered young lady — Deok-su and Pyung-Dal enters Ji-Eun's apartment, where they promptly discovered the decapitated head of Ji-Eun's roommate in her refrigerator. The former detective surmises that Ji-Eun must have been kidnapped and convinces Deok-su not to inform the police lest they put the missing woman's life in danger. The two men then team up to track down the kidnapper and rescue Ji-Eun.

After many twists and turns the perpetrator is revealed to be a mild-mannered doctor admired around town for his medical volunteer work and his seemingly selfless devotion to his paralysed wife.

Cast

 Baek Yoon-sik as Shim Deok-su 
 Sung Dong-il as Park Pyung-dal 
 Chun Ho-jin as Na Jung-hyuk 
 Wi Ha-joon as young Jung-hyuk 
 Bae Jong-ok as Min Young-Sook
 Jo Dal-hwan as Police officer Lee
 Kim Hye-in as Kim Ji-eun
 Park Hyung-soo as Bae Doo-sik
 Son Jong-hak as Mr. Choi
 Jo Hyun-sik as young Mr. Choi
 Lee Kan-hee as Jung-hyuk's wife
 Park Ji-hyun as Kim Soo-kyung
 Kim Si-young as Caregiver
 Kang Mal-geum as Caregiver 2
 Oh Chi-woon as President Song
 Lee Kwang-se as Jeong Man-hong
 Lee Min-woong as Pyung-dal's son
 Lee Jeong-eun as Ji-eun's mom
 Kim Hyun as Factory woman
 Son Seong-chan as Police chief 
 Jung Sung-il as young Pyung-dal 
 Oh Hee-joon as Gangster
 Yoo Jae-myung as Detective Go
 Jung Yoo-min as young Yeong-sook
 Yoon Jin as young Jeong-ae

Release

Box office
The Chase was released in South Korea on November 29, 2017.

References

External links

The Chase at Naver Movies 

2017 films
2017 crime thriller films
2010s serial killer films
Films based on South Korean webtoons
South Korean crime thriller films
South Korean chase films
South Korean serial killer films
2010s South Korean films